Ousmane Mané (born 1 October 1990 in Diourbel) is a Senegalese professional footballer who plays for as a goalkeeper for Hafia FC.

He represented Senegal at the 2012 Summer Olympics Football Tournament.

References

Living people
1990 births
People from Diourbel Region
Senegalese footballers
Association football goalkeepers
Senegal international footballers
Olympic footballers of Senegal
Footballers at the 2012 Summer Olympics
Diambars FC players
Casa Sports players
Hafia FC players